Limestone is a sedimentary rock composed predominantly of calcium carbonate (calcite and/or aragonite).

Limestone may also refer to:

Geological deposits made of limestone
 Aymestry Limestone
 Indiana Limestone
 Solnhofen limestone

Places

Australia

 Limestone, Queensland, a locality in Rockhampton Region

 Limestone, Victoria

Canada
 Limestone, New Brunswick (disambiguation)
 Little Limestone Lake, Manitoba

European Alps
 Northern Limestone Alps
 Southern Limestone Alps

United States
 Limestone, Illinois
 Limestone, Kentucky, former name for the city of Maysville
 Limestone, Maine, a town
 Limestone (CDP), Maine, a census-designated place in the town of Limestone
 Limestone, Michigan
 Limestone, New York
 Limestone, Oklahoma
 Limestone, Tennessee
 Limestone, West Virginia
 Limestone Creek, Florida
 Limestone Mountain, a summit in West Virginia

Other uses 
 Limestone (album), an album by Joe Camilleri and Nicky Bomba
 Limestone University, South Carolina, United States of America

See also
Limestone Coast (disambiguation)
 Limestone County (disambiguation)
 Limestone Run (disambiguation)
 Limestone Township (disambiguation)